The 1930–31 Harvard Crimson men's ice hockey season was the 33rd season of play for the program. The team represented Harvard University and was coached by Joseph Stubbs in his 4th season.

Season
The defending intercollegiate co-champions began their season with 75 men trying out for the team. After coach Stubbs whittled the team down to size, the Crimson debuted against MIT and won comfortably, 7–2. After the game the team took a few weeks off before reprising their annual meeting with Toronto at Madison Square Garden. This time the Crimson came away victorious and then embarked on a road trip to Canada. They trounced Michigan 7–0 and then won a close victory over McGill to keep their record unblemished. On their way home, Harvard stopped in Syracuse for another victory.

The Crimson had a busy week, playing at home for a match before hitting the road and then returning for the final before breaking for examinations. In the three games the Crimson didn't allow a single goal and scored 25 times to push their record to a perfect 8–0. They played their first game at Army's new rink and faced Middlebury for the first time in program history.

After a month off, Harvard returned to the ice against Dartmouth. The time off looked to have dulled the Crimson but the team still managed to win 4–2. After a close shave in the rematch in Hanover, the team headed to Canada a second time to visit McGill. team captain Harwood Ellis led Harvard to its fifth shutout of the season and returned home with a sterling 11–0 record. The Crimson were set to face Yale to end the year, with neither team having lost a single intercollegiate game, and the winner would be crowned the Eastern Intercollegiate Champion. The vaunted Harvard offense that existed before the extended break never materialized. The Crimson scored once in each of the two games against Yale and the team had to resign itself to second-best in 1931.

Roster

Standings

Schedule and results

|-
!colspan=12 style=";" | Regular Season

References

Harvard Crimson men's ice hockey seasons
Harvard
Harvard
Harvard
Harvard
Harvard